Júlia Hársfalvi (born 12 November 1996) is a Hungarian handballer who plays for Ferencvárosi TC.

Achievements 
EHF Champions League:
: 2017
: 2016
Nemzeti Bajnokság I:
: 2016, 2017
Magyar Kupa:
: 2016
Handball-Bundesliga:
: 2019

References

1996 births
Living people
People from Zalaegerszeg
Hungarian female handball players
Győri Audi ETO KC players
Sportspeople from Zala County